The Japanese Lantern Monument is a symbol of political relations between the Japanese government and South Africa. This monument is currently located at the Company's Garden in Cape Town. A lantern is portable light device used as a source of light or touch like mechanism to illuminate an area of darkness. In traditional Japanese society, lanterns have been very significant in both culture and religion. In 1933, the Japanese government offered to construct a lantern monument in the Company's Garden which was handed to the Government of South Africa as a symbol of appreciation for their benevolence towards Japanese immigrants during World War I.

Background 

Relations between South Africa and Japan are believed to have started around the year 1643 when Jan van Riebeeck (the first commander of the Cape) visited Japan to establish trade relations. In 1889 the first Japanese shop was opened on Adderley Street in Cape Town. Long before the First World War broke out in 1919, the two countries were slowly building their trade and diplomatic relations. However, these diplomatic and trade relations only took roots in 1910 when the first Japanese Honorary Consul Julius Otto Jeppe was appointed to South Africa. In 2010 the two countries celebrated 100 years of trade and diplomatic co-operations.

History 

The history of Japanese lanterns can be traced to have had its roots from China. As far back as 250 B.C.E. the Chinese used lanterns to celebrate religious and cultural festivals as well a form of decoration for Chinese homes. However, Chinese lanterns originated as a form of communication within the military between soldiers in the battle field. It is believed that "a popular military strategist Zhuge Liang created the first flying lantern in China. This was later incorporated into Buddhism and Hinduism once Chinese Monks began to use lanterns to light temples. A Korean Buddhist monk is said to have transported the use of lanterns to Japan. With the introduction of Buddhism in Japan, the use of lanterns became a part of the common religious practices, and later became very symbolic in the Japanese military and culture. Japanese lanterns were first used in cultural festivals held in honour of departed loved ones. These sculptured lanterns, floating lanterns, hanging lanterns, and hand held lanterns are believed to guide the spirit of the departed ones. The names of the departed loved ones are inscribed on the lanterns. Lanterns are often used during special ceremonies such as marriages, births, and deaths.

The Japanese government in 1932 erected a granite-like stone lantern which was handed to the government of Cape Town in appreciation of their benevolence towards Japanese immigrants in the 1930s. "According to Crump & van Niekerk (1988) this gift was the first of two gifts from the Government of Japan." The gift symbolises a political co-operation between Japan and South Africa about a decade after the end of the First World War. It is not clear who designed and constructed the monument. Though the monument was built to represent a symbol of appreciation to the South African government, it was also intended to fulfil cultural heritages of former soldiers who carried out the lighting of lanterns to appease the spirit of their war victims.

See also
 Japanese lantern

Notes and references

External links 
 Denis Events Wordpress
 Japan Talk

Buildings and structures in Cape Town
Japan–South Africa relations 
Monuments and memorials in South Africa